Pamexis is a genus of antlions found in South Africa.

Species 
 Pamexis bifasciata (Olivier, 1811)
 Pamexis contaminata Hagen, 1887
 Pamexis hantam Mansell & Ball, 2016
 Pamexis karoo Mansell, 1992
 Pamexis lutea (Thunberg, 1784)
 Pamexis namaqua Mansell, 1992

References

External links 

Myrmeleontidae genera
Insects of South Africa
Myrmeleontidae